The Berne Gauge or Berne Convention Gauge is an informal but widely used term for the railway loading gauge considered the standard gauge in most of Europe. The term arises from the international railway conference held and consequent convention signed in Bern, Switzerland in 1912.

This is a clearance envelope (see loading gauge) on a curve of  radius.

Previously, international through traffic, particularly freight, had been effectively constrained to vehicles and loads consistent with the standard French loading gauge, the narrowest and lowest in Mainland Europe. As a result of accepting the convention, the French embarked on a period of progressive upgrade to make their network compliant.

Comparison 
Even after adopting the convention, significant parts of the European network, such as Belgium and most Germanic countries, as well as Scandinavia, operated to larger gauges, thus restricting the interchange of traffic from those areas.

Although the name "PPI" includes the characterisation as "international" it is actually the minimum standard just in Western Europe. Similarly the tracks in Sweden are built to 3,400 mm (clearance SE-A and SE-B) just as the broad-gauge network under Russian influence (on tracks with 1,520 mm). Parts of the German network are built to accommodate wider trains from neighbouring countries.

European freight network 
In general the deck height of flatcars was reduced to 940 mm to allow for shipping containers to fit in the "GB" clearance in France. It was further modified so that for the minimum height of the exterior walls (3,175 mm) and the minimum height at the center (4320 mm) a third height was added such that at a width of 2720 mm a minimum height of 4180 mm is ensured. This profile was dubbed "GB+" and has a roof that is almost flat. All modern freight tracks in Western Europe are built to this size, the modern replacement for the PPI minimum international loading gauge.

In comparison the central European "GC" loading gauge allows the use traditional flatcars with a deck height of 1,100 to 1,300 mm to carry intermodal shipping containers. Trains with Hi-Cube containers can not pass from Germany into France.

References

External links
 Technical specification for interoperability relating to the rolling stock subsystem of the trans-European high-speed rail system

Rail loading gauge